Taubateia paraiba was a species of catfish from the family Loricariidae. It was found in the Tremembé Formation sediments of the Taubaté Basin in eastern São Paulo State, Brazil. The genus name Taubateia comes from the name Taubate, in reference to the basin where the fossil comes from. The species name paraiba comes from the name of the river Paraíba do Sul.

It is unclear to which subfamily T. paraiba belongs.

References

Further reading 
 

Loricariidae
Prehistoric fish of South America
Oligocene animals of South America
Miocene animals of South America
Deseadan
Paleogene Brazil
Neogene Brazil
Fossils of Brazil
Fossil taxa described in 2007